Deer Creek Canyon is the third studio album by singer-songwriter Sera Cahoone, released September 25, 2012 on Sub Pop Records.

Track list
 Worry All Your Life
 Deer Creek Canyon
 Naked
 Nervous Wreck
 And We Still Move
 Every Little Word
 One to Blame
 Rumpshaker
 Shakin' Hands
 Anyway You Like
 Here With Me
 Oh My

Personnel
Sera Cahoone – Guitar, Vocals
Jeff Fielder – Banjo, Guitar, Vocals
Jonas Haskins – Bass
Jason Kardong – Pedal steel guitar
Jason Merculief – Drums

References

External links
 

Sub Pop albums
2012 albums
Sera Cahoone albums